Nora Azurmendi Arzallus (born 10 October 1995) is a Spanish handballer for Super Amara Bera Bera.

Achievements

Spanish League:
 Winner: 2012/13, 2017/18

 Copa de la Reina de Balonmano:
 Winner: 2012/13
 Runner-up: 2017/18

References 

Living people
1995 births
Spanish female handball players
Sportspeople from San Sebastián
Handball players from the Basque Country (autonomous community)
21st-century Spanish women